West Hagbourne is a village and civil parish in the Berkshire Downs about  south of Didcot. The 2011 Census recorded a parish population of 259.

History
The village was part of Berkshire until the 1974 boundary changes transferred it to Oxfordshire and from the former Wallingford Rural District to the district of South Oxfordshire. It was separated from East Hagbourne in the late Middle Ages.

Amenities
West Hagbourne's Church of England parish church is St Andrew's, East Hagbourne. West Hagbourne has a public house, the Horse and Harrow.

Education
Hagbourne Church of England Primary School in neighbouring East Hagbourne serves West Hagbourne. The County secondary schools that serve West Hagbourne are in Didcot: St. Birinus School (for boys) and Didcot Girls School.

Transport
Thames Travel route 94 serves West Hagbourne from Mondays to Fridays, linking the village with Didcot town and with Didcot Parkway railway station. Buses run mostly once an hour, with a half-hourly service in the evening peak. There is no Saturday or Sunday service.

References

Sources

External links

 West Hagbourne Oxfordshire

Civil parishes in Oxfordshire
Villages in Oxfordshire